Super Crazy (Francisco Islas Rueda, born 1973) is a Mexican Luchador.

Super Crazy may also refer to:
 Super Crazy (album), 2012 album by Todd Barry
 Super Crazy (film), 2018 Argentine-Uruguayan film